Bayonne Energy Center is a power plant on Constable Hook in Bayonne, New Jersey originally built as a joint venture between Hess Corporation and ArcLight Capital Partners. it is operated by EthosEnergy.

The 644-megawatt natural gas-fired plant came on line in 2012. It connects to a 6.5 mile, 345-kilovolt power line under the Upper New York Bay connecting with a Consolidated Edison substation in Gowanus in Brooklyn, New York which is the longest XLPE cable in the world.

The submarine cable portion of the project is one of the most deeply buried submarine cables at 15 feet below New Jersey-New York Harbor bottom. On behalf of the Project, regulator permit applications were prepared and submitted to the New York State Department of Public Service (Article VII), the US Army Corps of Engineers New York District (Sections 10/404), the New York Department of Environmental Conservation, the New York Department of State, and the New York Office of General Services.

In 2014, Hess relinquished it interest in the plant to ArcLight. which later sold it to Macquarie Infrastructure Company

See also
NYISO
Hudson Project, cable connecting Bergen Generating Station to Manhattan
Neptune Cable 
Hudson Generating Station
Kearny Generating Station
Newark Energy Center
List of power stations in New Jersey

References

External links
MasterElectricTransmissionPlanforNYC 2009
http://www.nyiso.com/public/webdocs/markets_operations/documents/Legal_and_Regulatory/FERC_Filings/2013/October/NYISO_BEC_ARIA_complete.pdf

Natural gas-fired power stations in New Jersey
Bayonne, New Jersey
Power stations in Hudson County, New Jersey
New York City infrastructure
Electric power transmission systems in New Jersey
Electric power transmission systems in the United States
2012 establishments in New Jersey
Energy infrastructure completed in 2012